René Pétillon (12 December 1945 – 30 September 2018) was a French satirical and political cartoonist and comics artist. As a cartoonist he was most famous for his work in Canard Enchaîné. As a comics artist his best known and longest-running series was the humoristic comic strip Jack Palmer, about a goofy private detective.

Pétillon joined Pilote magazine in 1972. From 1993, he published cartoons in the Canard Enchaîné and he signed them as Pétillon.

In 1989, he was awarded the Grand Prix de la ville at the Angoulême International Comics Festival. In 2002 he get the Grand prix de l'humour vache at the Salon international du dessin de presse et d'humour in Saint-Just-le-Martel.

In 2001, he published L'Enquête Corse ("The Corsican Enquiry"), dealing with the "independentist" groups in Corsica. The album was a popular and critical success, with 300,000 printed in French plus 30,000 in Corsican. A movie of the same name, starring Jean Reno, was based on the book and released in 2004.

His work appeared in L'Écho des Savanes too and in 2015 he also published in Charlie Hebdo.

He died in 2018 after a long illness.

References

External links

 René Pétillon official art gallery 
 Lambiek Comiclopedia article

1945 births
2018 deaths
French cartoonists
French comics artists
French satirists
Grand Prix de la ville d'Angoulême winners
Charlie Hebdo people
People from Finistère